Gilbert Stuart (1755–1828) was an American painter from Rhode Island.

Gilbert Stuart may also refer to:

Gilbert Stuart (writer) (1742–1786), Scottish journalist and historian
Gilbert Stuart (Goodridge), a  painting by Sarah Goodridge
SS Gilbert Stuart, on the List of Allied vessels struck by Japanese special attack weapons during World War II

See also 
Gilbert Stuart Birthplace, a museum located in Saunderstown, Rhode Island